In combustion, the Williams spray equation, also known as the Williams–Boltzmann equation, describes the statistical evolution of sprays contained in another fluid, analogous to the Boltzmann equation for the molecules, named after Forman A. Williams, who derived the equation in 1958.

Mathematical description
The sprays are assumed to be spherical with radius , even though the assumption is valid for solid particles(liquid droplets) when their shape has no consequence on the combustion.

Then the spray equation for the evolution of this density function is given by

where
 is the force per unit mass acting on the  species spray (acceleration applied to the sprays),

 is the rate of change of the size of the  species spray,

 is the rate of change of the temperature of the  species spray due to heat transfer,

  is the rate of change of number density function of  species spray due to nucleation, liquid breakup etc.,

 is the rate of change of number density function of  species spray due to collision with other spray particles.

A simplified model for liquid propellant rocket
This model for the rocket motor was developed by Probert, Williams and Tanasawa. It is reasonable to neglect , for distances not very close to the spray atomizer, where major portion of combustion occurs. Neglecting (density function is defined without the temperature so accordingly dimensions of  changes) and due to the fact that the mean flow is parallel to  axis, the steady spray equation reduces to

where  is the velocity in  direction. Integrating with respect to the velocity results

The contribution from the last term (spray acceleration term) becomes zero (using Divergence theorem) since  when  is very large, which is typically the case in rocket motors. The drop size rate  is well modeled using vaporization mechanisms as

Defining the number of droplets per unit volume per unit radius and average quantities averaged over velocities,

the equation becomes

.

where  are the number distribution and mean velocity at  respectively.

See also
Boltzmann equation
Spray (liquid drop)
Liquid-propellant rocket
Smoluchowski coagulation equation

References

Equations of physics
Combustion
Fluid dynamics